The Republic of Poland Ambassador to Lithuania oversees Embassy of Poland in that country. They supervise the embassy staff in the conduct of diplomatic relations with the Republic of Lithuania and coordination of the activities of Polish Government personnel serving in Lithuania as well as official visitors. Under the ambassador's direction, the embassy staff provides consular services, including visas for visitors to Poland and passports for Poland citizens in Lithuania.

List of ambassadors of Poland to Lithuania

Second Polish Republic 

 1938-1939: Franciszek Charwat (envoy)

Third Polish Republic 

 1991-1992: Mariusz Maszkiewicz (chargé d’affaires)
 1992-1996: Jan Widacki
 1996-2001: Eufemia Teichmann
 2001-2005: Jerzy Bahr
 2005-2013: Janusz Skolimowski
 2013-2017: Jarosław Czubiński
 since 2017: Urszula Doroszewska

References 

Lithuania
Poland